Rzhev (also given as Ryev, Rzev, Rjzev) is an air base of the Russian Air Force in Tver Oblast, Russia located 5 km east of Rzhev.  It was a Tupolev Tu-128 (ASCC: Fiddler) depot airfield during the Cold War, operated by BKhAT (Aviation Equipment Storage Base).  The airfield also had an interceptor role with the 23rd Interceptor Aviation Regiment (23 IAP) between 1950 and 1980.  This regiment was disbanded in the early 1980s but was resurrected a decade later at Dzyomgi Airport in the Russian Far East.

The base is currently home to the 514th Aviation Repair Plant.

The 23 IAP initially operated the Sukhoi Su-9 (ASCC: Fishpot) in the 1960s. The regiment ceased using the Su-9 in 1979 or 1980 and did not upgrade to the Mikoyan-Gurevich MiG-23 (ASCC: Flogger) as many other Su-9 regiments did at the time. When the airfield was imaged in 1981, US analysts observed 102 Su-9 aircraft in storage and noted the south dispersal area had become a regional storage facility for the type.

The base was also used by the 445th Fighter Aviation Regiment between 1951 and 1961 with the Mikoyan-Gurevich MiG-17 (ASCC: Fresco).

References

Russian Air Force bases
Soviet Air Force bases
Soviet Air Defence Force bases
Airports built in the Soviet Union
Airports in Tver Oblast